Vojislav V. Jovanović (28 June 1940 – 5 March 2018) was a Serbian novelist and writer of short stories, prose and poems.

Biography
Vojislav V. Jovanović was born in Niška Banja, Niš, Serbia (Kingdom of Yugoslavia at the time). He has published 28 books of novels, prose and poetry. His works are included in various anthologies of Serbian literature and have been translated to English, French, Dutch, Romanian and Catalan language. Vojislav V. Jovanović also published numerous articles in various literary journals and magazines such as Književne novine, Književna reč, Književni list, Književni magazin, Reč, Politika, Priča, Beogradski književni časopis, Gradina, Gradac (translation), Poezija, Letopis Matice srpske, Raška, Slava and others.

Vojislav V. Jovanović was a member of the editorial board of Književne novine from 1984 to 2000. He never received any award for his works. He died in Belgrade on 5 March 2018.

Works
 Dajmonion I, novel, Prosveta, Belgrade, COBISS.SR-ID 109184775, 1971
 Samoubistvo, stories, M. Josić, Belgrade, V. V. Jovanović, Belgrade, Biblioteka G. 1, 1981
 Smrtovnica, poems, Radiša Timotič, Belgrade, COBISS.SR-ID 13186055, 1984
 Teskoba, poems, Grafos, Beograd, 1986
 Sion, novel, Beogradski izdavačko-grafički zavod, Belgrade, 1987
 Dvoglava kornjača, stories, Filip Višnjić, Belgrade, 1996
 Sionski soneti, poems, Društvo Istočnik, Belgrade, COBISS.SR-ID	139449095, 1997/98
 Mrtva priroda, poem, Umetničko društvo Gradac, Čačak/Belgrade, COBISS.SR-ID 1024007607, 1998
 Pesme za mrtvu, poems, Umetničko društvo Gradac, Čačak/Belgrade, 2001
 Crv u rani, poems, Društvo Istočnik, Belgarde, 2003
 Groblja, poems, Gradac, Čačak/Belgrade, 2003
 Sedam pesama, poems, Društvo Istočnik, Belgrade, 2005
 Poreklo crva, poems, Društvo Istočnik, Belgrade, 2006
 Stanični bife, stories, Gradac, Čačak/Belgrade, 2006
 Istinite priče o čoveku zvanom Veliki Mao, stories, Gradac, Čačak/Belgrade, 2006
 Bolest bogova, poem, Matična Biblioteka "Svetozar marković", Zaječar, 2007
 Priča za Roberta Valzera, stories, Medijska knjižara Krug, Belgrade, 2007
 Sokrat, krčmar i krčmarev sin, prose, Gradac, Čačak, 2009
 Pesnička grba, poems, Društvo Istočnik, Belgrade, 2009
 Metak u leđa, stories, Gradac. Čačak/Belgrade, 2010
 Neljudske priče, stories, Gradac, Čačak, 2011
 Sokratova smrt / Epimenid, prose, Biblioteka "Lađa" Gradac K, Čačak, 2012
 Jutarnji grob, poems, Društvo Istočnik, Belgrade, 2012
 Mrtav, poems, Biblioteka "Lađa" Gradac K, Čačak, 2013
 Smrt jednorukog čoveka, novel, Biblioteka "Lađa" Gradac K, Čačak, 2014
 Bolest i njen vlasnik, poem, Društvo Istočnik, Belgrade, 2014
 Venezia, Riva degli Schiavoni, poem and prose, Biblioteka "Lađa" Gradac K, Čačak, 2016
 Mrtve reči, poems, Biblioteka "Lađa" Gradac K, Čačak, 2017

Sources
 National Library of Serbia
Cultural Centre of Belgrade

References

External links
"Kurac, pička, govno, sisa", Polja No 473
Književne novine
 Preminuo Vojislav V. Jovanović (1940-2018)

Serbian writers
Serbian novelists
20th-century Serbian poets
Serbian male short story writers
Serbian short story writers
1940 births
2018 deaths
21st-century Serbian poets
Serbian male poets
20th-century male writers
21st-century male writers